Gordon Lyon (also known by his pseudonym Fyodor Vaskovich) is an American network security expert, creator of Nmap and writer of books, websites, and technical papers about network security. He is a founding member of the Honeynet Project and was Vice President of Computer Professionals for Social Responsibility.

Personal life
Lyon has been active in the network security community since the mid-1990s. His handle, "Fyodor", was taken from Russian author Fyodor Dostoyevsky. Most of his programming is done in the C, C++, and Perl programming languages.

Opposition to grayware
In December 2011, Lyon published his strong dislike of the way Download.com started bundling grayware with their installation managers and concerns over the bundled software, causing many people to spread the post on social networks, and a few dozen media reports. The main problem is the confusion between Download.com-offered content and software offered by original authors; the accusations included deception as well as copyright and trademark violation.

Lyon lost control of the Nmap SourceForge page in 2015, with Sourceforge taking over the project's page and offering adware wrapped download bundles. The original SourceForge page no longer contains any files  and the Sourceforge "mirror" page  used to hijack the Nmap account redirects to the official https://nmap.org/.

Websites

Lyon maintains several network security web sites:
 Nmap.Org – Host of the Nmap security scanner and its documentation
 SecTools.Org – The top 100 network security tools (ranked by thousands of Nmap users)
 SecLists.Org – Archive of the most common security mailing lists
 Insecure.Org – His main site, offering security news/updates, exploit world archive, and other misc. security resources

Published books

Lyon has written and co-authored several books:

 Know Your Enemy: Revealing the Security Tools, Tactics, and Motives of the Blackhat Community, co-authored with other members of the Honeynet Project. A 2nd edition is now available, as are sample chapters.
 Stealing the Network: How to Own a Continent. Hacker fiction, but tries to stay realistic. Co-authored with Kevin Mitnick and other hackers. Gordon's chapter is freely available online.
 Nmap Network Scanning

Interviews
Public interviews with Lyon/Vaskovich have been posted by SecurityFocus, Slashdot, Zone-H, TuxJournal, Safemode, and Google.  Many of these provide more personal details than his official bio page does.

Conferences
Lyon attends and speaks at many security conferences. He has presented at DEFCON, CanSecWest, FOSDEM, IT Security World, Security Masters' Dojo, ShmooCon, IT-Defense, SFOBug, and others.

See also
 W00w00

References

External links
 Home page

Living people
Writers about computer security
American computer programmers
Free software programmers
American technology writers
Writers from California
1977 births